James Aubrey Naile (born February 8, 1993) is an American professional baseball pitcher in the St. Louis Cardinals organization. He has played in Major League Baseball (MLB) for the Cardinals.

Amateur career
Naile graduated from Charleston High School in Charleston, Missouri. He attended Parkland College, a junior college, despite receiving offers from Arkansas State University and Southeast Missouri State University, which both play college baseball in NCAA Division I. After spending two years at Parkland, Naile transferred to the University of Alabama at Birmingham (UAB) to play for the UAB Blazers. Naile had Tommy John surgery to repair the ulnar collateral ligament of the elbow in 2013.

Professional career

Oakland Athletics
The Oakland Athletics selected Naile in the 20th round of the 2015 MLB draft. In 2016, Naile was named the best defensive pitcher in Minor League Baseball.

St. Louis Cardinals
Naile became a free agent and signed with the St. Louis Cardinals organization after the 2021 season.

The Cardinals promoted Naile to the major leagues on June 27, 2022. He made his MLB debut that night versus the Miami Marlins, pitching one scoreless inning of relief. He made seven total appearances for the Cardinals in his rookie campaign, posting a 5.00 ERA with five strikeouts in nine innings pitched.

On February 8, 2023, Naile was designated for assignment by St. Louis following the acquisition of Anthony Misiewicz. On February 10, Naile cleared waivers and was sent outright to the Triple-A Memphis Redbirds.

Personal life
Naile grew up as a fan of the Cardinals. His mother died in 2018.

References

External links

Living people
1993 births
People from Cape Girardeau, Missouri
Baseball players from Missouri
Major League Baseball pitchers
St. Louis Cardinals players
Parkland Cobras baseball players
UAB Blazers baseball players
Arizona League Athletics players
Vermont Lake Monsters players
Beloit Snappers players
Stockton Ports players
Midland RockHounds players
Nashville Sounds players
Las Vegas Aviators players
Memphis Redbirds players